Best Of is a compilation of songs released by the German hard rock singer Doro Pesch and by her former band Warlock with the label Vertigo Records. The compilation was published after the singer had left the label in 1996, ending a ten years long collaboration.

Track listing

References

External links
American site

Doro (musician) compilation albums
1998 compilation albums
Vertigo Records compilation albums